The 1986–87 NBA season was the 41st season of the National Basketball Association. The season ended with the Los Angeles Lakers winning their fourth championship of the decade, beating the Boston Celtics 4 games to 2 in the NBA Finals.

Notable occurrences

 Boston Celtics' top draft pick Len Bias died of a cocaine overdose barely two days after the draft. In the wake of Micheal Ray Richardson's lifetime suspension, several NBA players were suspended for violations of the anti-drug policy; among them Houston Rockets forward Lewis Lloyd and guard Mitchell Wiggins.
On April 17, three Phoenix Suns players (James Edwards, Jay Humphries, and Grant Gondrezick) and two former players (Gar Heard and Mike Bratz) were indicted for cocaine trafficking at a popular Phoenix nightclub.  Several other players were also involved in the scandal.
 When Mychal Thompson joined the Lakers this season alongside the likes of Kareem Abdul-Jabbar, Magic Johnson, and James Worthy, the Lakers became the first team to ever have four different #1 draft picks join the same team.
 The 1987 NBA All-Star Game was played at the Kingdome in Seattle, with the West defeating the East 154–149 in overtime. To the delight of the Seattle crowd, the SuperSonics' Tom Chambers won the game's MVP award. Michael Jordan won his first Slam Dunk Contest.
 This was the final NBA season for Philadelphia's Julius Erving who announced his retirement that year. NBA arenas paid tribute to Erving's retirement by staging special events for him. The New Jersey Nets, in particular, retired Erving's No. 32 jersey for his contributions with the franchise. Thus Erving became the only player to have his number retired by a team while still an active player.
 Michael Jordan joined Wilt Chamberlain as only the second player in NBA history to score 3000 points in a season. With a 37.1 ppg, Jordan also began a seven-year reign as the NBA's scoring champion, tied with Chamberlain for the league record.
 This was the last season the Lakers and Celtics matched up in the NBA Finals until 2008.
 The 1986–87 season was also known as the "Golden Era" of the NBA. The 1987 NBA season featured up to 22 Hall of Fame players such as Magic Johnson, Kareem Abdul-Jabbar, James Worthy, Larry Bird, Michael Jordan, Kevin McHale, Robert Parish, Bill Walton, Moses Malone, Julius Erving, Isiah Thomas, Dominique Wilkins, Charles Barkley, Akeem Olajuwon, Clyde Drexler, Karl Malone, John Stockton, Alex English, Patrick Ewing, Adrian Dantley, Joe Dumars, and Dennis Rodman.
 Despite finishing with a sub-.500 record, the Seattle SuperSonics were able to upset the Dallas Mavericks and Houston Rockets before bowing down to the Los Angeles Lakers in the Western Conference Finals in a four-game sweep.
 In a game on February 4, 1987, the Los Angeles Lakers set two NBA records by jumping out to a 29–0 lead over the Sacramento Kings and leading by 36 points (40–4) at the end of the first quarter.  The Lakers went on to win, 128–92.
 The NBA logo was prominently displayed on the uniforms for the first time (usually on the left side of the jersey; it was moved to the top rear in 2014), becoming the first sports league in North America to do so. The practice of placing the league logo on the jerseys eventually spreads to the NFL, NHL and MLB.
 Fernando Martín became the first Spanish player to play in the NBA when he debuted for the Portland Trail Blazers in December 1986. He would pave the way for future Spanish players in the league, including five-time NBA All-Star Pau Gasol.
 Los Angeles Clippers becoming the second team in NBA history to lose 70 or more games joining the 1972–73 76ers, the latter was (1992–93 Mavericks, 1997–98 Nuggets, 2009–10 Nets (including losing 18 straight games to start the season), and the 2015–16 76ers (including a record–tying 26–game losing streak also including losing 18 straight games to start the season).
Michael Jordan becomes the first player in NBA history to accumulate over 200 steals with over 100 blocks in a season.
Larry Bird becomes the first player in NBA history to enter the 50–40–90 club.

1986–87 NBA changes
 The Milwaukee Bucks changed their uniforms removing the red areas on the side panels to their jerseys and shorts.

Final standings

By division

By conference

Notes
z – Clinched home court advantage for the entire playoffs
c – Clinched home court advantage for the conference playoffs
y – Clinched division title
x – Clinched playoff spot

Playoffs
Teams in bold advanced to the next round. The numbers to the left of each team indicate the team's seeding in its conference, and the numbers to the right indicate the number of games the team won in that round. The division champions are marked by an asterisk. Home court advantage does not necessarily belong to the higher-seeded team, but instead the team with the better regular season record; teams enjoying the home advantage are shown in italics.

Statistics leaders

NBA awards

Yearly awards
 Most Valuable Player: Magic Johnson, Los Angeles Lakers
 Rookie of the Year: Chuck Person, Indiana Pacers
 Defensive Player of the Year: Michael Cooper, Los Angeles Lakers
 Sixth Man of the Year: Ricky Pierce, Milwaukee Bucks
 Most Improved Player: Dale Ellis, Seattle SuperSonics
 Coach of the Year: Mike Schuler, Portland Trail Blazers

 All-NBA First Team:
 F – Larry Bird, Boston Celtics
 F – Kevin McHale, Boston Celtics
 C – Akeem Olajuwon, Houston Rockets
 G – Michael Jordan, Chicago Bulls
 G – Magic Johnson, Los Angeles Lakers

 All-NBA Second Team:
 F – Dominique Wilkins, Atlanta Hawks
 F – Charles Barkley, Philadelphia 76ers
 C – Moses Malone, Washington Bullets
 G – Isiah Thomas, Detroit Pistons
 G – Fat Lever, Denver Nuggets

 All-NBA Rookie Team:
 John "Hot Rod"  Williams, Cleveland Cavaliers
 Roy Tarpley, Dallas Mavericks
 Chuck Person, Indiana Pacers
 Brad Daugherty, Cleveland Cavaliers
 Ron Harper, Cleveland Cavaliers

 NBA All-Defensive First Team:
Kevin McHale, Boston Celtics
Michael Cooper, Los Angeles Lakers
Akeem Olajuwon, Houston Rockets
Alvin Robertson, San Antonio Spurs
Dennis Johnson, Boston Celtics

 NBA All-Defensive Second Team:
Paul Pressey, Milwaukee Bucks
Rodney McCray, Houston Rockets
Mark Eaton, Utah Jazz
Maurice Cheeks, Philadelphia 76ers
Derek Harper, Dallas Mavericks

Player of the week
The following players were named NBA Player of the Week.

Player of the month
The following players were named NBA Player of the Month.

Rookie of the month
The following players were named NBA Rookie of the Month.

Coach of the month
The following coaches were named NBA Coach of the Month.

References

 
1986–87 in American basketball by league